Kilampadi is a panchayat town in Erode district in the Indian state of Tamil Nadu.

Demographics
 India census, Kilampadi had a population of 6345. Males constitute 49% of the population and females 51%. Kilampadi has an average literacy rate of 61%, higher than the national average of 59.5%: male literacy is 72%, and female literacy is 51%. In Kilampadi, 7% of the population is under 6 years of age.

References

Cities and towns in Erode district